Milk and Scissors is the second album by American band the Handsome Family. It was released 1996 by Carrot Top Records, and by Scout Releases in the same year.

Production
The production of the album was interrupted by Brett's brief stay in a mental hospital.

Critical reception
The Chicago Tribune called Milk and Scissors "one of the finest albums of 1996." The Chicago Reader called it "wonderfully depressing."

Track listing
All music by Brett Sparks and all lyrics by Rennie Sparks, except as noted
 "Lake Geneva" – 3:11
 "Winnebago Skeletons" – 4:13
 "Drunk By Noon" – 2:51
 "The House Carpenter" (traditional, arranged by The Handsome Family, inspired by Clarence Ashley's 1930 recording) – 3:36
 "The Dutch Boy" – 3:51
 "The King Who Wouldn't Smile" – 2:35
 "Emily Shore 1819-1839" – 4:34
 "3-Legged Dog" (Darrell Sparks)– 4:34
 "#1 Country Song" (Brett Sparks) – 3:35
 "Amelia Earhart vs. The Dancing Bear" - 3:13
 "Tin Foil" - 2:41
 "Puddin' Fingers" (Mike Werner) - 1:41

Personnel
 The Handsome Family:
Brett Sparks - guitar, vocals, dobro, organ, harmonica, lap steel
Rennie Sparks - bass, vocals
Mike Werner - percussion
 Diane Murphy - band photo
 Brad Miller - cover photo
 Design by Rennie & Mike with Sheila Sachs

References

External links
The Handsome Family official website

1996 albums
Carrot Top Records albums
The Handsome Family albums